The 2016–17 Bucknell Bison men's basketball team represented Bucknell University during the 2016–17 NCAA Division I men's basketball season. The Bison, led by second-year head coach Nathan Davis, played their home games at Sojka Pavilion in Lewisburg, Pennsylvania as members of the Patriot League. They finished the regular season 23–8, 15–3 in Patriot League play to win the regular season championship, their third straight title and sixth in seven years. As the No. 1 seed in the Patriot League tournament, they defeated Army, Navy, and Lehigh to win the tournament championship. As a result, the Bison received the conference's automatic bid to the NCAA tournament as the No. 13 seed in the West region. There they lost in the first round to West Virginia.

Previous season
The Bison finished the 2015–16 season 17–14, 14–4 in Patriot League play to win the regular season championship for the second consecutive year. They lost in the quarterfinals of the Patriot League tournament to Holy Cross. As a regular season champion who failed to win their league tournament, they received an automatic bid to the National Invitation Tournament where they lost in the first round to Monmouth.

Offseason

Departures

2016 recruiting class

Roster

Schedule and results

|-
!colspan=9 style=| Non-conference regular season

|-
!colspan=9 style=| Patriot League regular season

|-
!colspan=9 style=| Patriot League tournament

|-
!colspan=9 style=| NCAA tournament

See also
 List of Bucknell Bison men's basketball seasons

References

Bucknell Bison men's basketball seasons
Bucknell
Bucknell
Bucknell
Bucknell